The Institute for Defense and Disarmament Studies was a U.S.-based policy research and advocacy organization. Their website described them as "a nonprofit center where we study global military policies, arms holdings, production and trade, arms control and peace-building efforts; and run educational programs on current and alternative policies."  IDDS was founded in 1980 by Director Dr. Randall Forsberg and was based in Cambridge, Massachusetts. One of the founding members of the board was former Manhattan Project physicist Philip Morrison.

External links

Organizations based in Cambridge, Massachusetts
Arms control
Peace organizations based in the United States